Don't Stop Believing is a British television talent show that aired on Channel 5 in summer 2010. It was inspired by the musical comedy-drama Glee, which airs in the United States on the Fox network. The series featured live shows in which musical performance groups competed against each other, with viewers voting on the winner. Solo singers were also sought to join a group to represent the United Kingdom on the American glee club circuit. The show was hosted by Emma Bunton, and judged by Anastacia, Duncan James, Tamzin Outhwaite and Charles "Chucky" Klapow. The programme was shown in simulcast on Irish TV channel 3e and repeated a week later on parent channel TV3 Ireland. The show was not renewed for a second series due to low ratings.

Development
Don't Stop Believing was produced by Shine TV and GroupM Entertainment. Based on the popularity of Glee and High School Musical and billed as Glee meets The X Factor, the show intended to combine elements of both singing and dancing competitions. Five's controller, Richard Woolfe, stated: "There's an explosion in musical performance groups and Don't Stop Believing will tap into that exciting groundswell. This will be the first series to combine both singing and dancing to create an amazing entertainment spectacle which will completely capture the viewers' imagination.". By May 2010, over 3,000 groups had applied to take part in the show via the Five website.

Social networking website MySpace is the show's online hub, featuring exclusive content including video webchats with the judges, highlights of the show and choreography tutorials. Users are able to purchase tracks from the programme directly through MySpace. Sophie Rouse, director of marketing at MySpace UK, stated: "As a platform dedicated to the discovery of new content, MySpace can add an extra dimension to big events like these, giving fans the opportunity to interact directly with the talent and exclusive content from the show."

Format
Established and new musical performance groups compete in a series of live shows, performing well-known songs in new arrangements. Contestants perform in front of celebrity judges, with viewers voting for the winner. Alongside the main competition, solo singers are invited to join a group to represent the United Kingdom on the American glee club circuit. Auditions are held while the series airs, with new members joining each week.

Judges and host
The show is hosted by Emma Bunton. Five's head of entertainment, Donna Taberer, stated that she was "utterly thrilled" to have Emma as part of the project, deeming her the "perfect host" due to her singing, dancing and presenting experience. Bunton commented: "Like millions of others I'm currently obsessed with musical performance groups so I am beyond excited", telling The Belfast Telegraph that she is a "huge fan" of Glee. The show's judges are former EastEnders actress Tamzin Outhwaite, Blue member Duncan James, singer Anastacia and High School Musical choreographer Charles "Chucky" Klapow.

Heats

Heat 1 (18 July 2010)

Heat 2 (25 July 2010)

Heat 3 (1 August 2010)

Heat 4 (8 August 2010)

Heat 5 (15 August 2010)

Heat five also featured repeat performances from the series' five wildcards, hoping to secure a place in the final. This place was won by Swish.

Final (22 August 2010)

Reception

Ratings
The debut episode was watched by 1.46 million viewers; 6.8% of the viewing audience. The second episode was watched by 1.09 million viewers; 4.8% of the viewing audience. It was watched by 587,000 viewers; a 2.4% audience share. The episode was moved from the 7 pm–8.30 pm timeslot to the 8 pm-9.30 pm slot to avoid a scheduling conflict with Cricket on Five and was down 51.5% on the channel's average audience share in the slot. Episode three was down 433,000 viewers.

Critical response
Carrie Dunn of The Guardian described Don't Stop Believing as "like Glee without the budget". Dunn felt that Five's "novice status" at producing live shows was evident, "with sound cutting in and out and jagged camera work." She noted, however: "the lack of production polish seemed quite fitting as the contestants were also endearingly amateur.". The Herald Graeme Virtue commented: "If, like me, you fell for Glee despite having a desiccated black fossil where your heart should be, it was most likely because the dementedly life-affirming musical numbers were punctuated by some smart, often prickly drama. However calculated Don't Stop Believing might be, by focusing wholly on the singin'-and-hoofin' dimension, it still risks reaching dangerous levels of non-cynicism that could irreversibly damage our national psyche in the long-term.". Emma Love of The Independent called the show "bang on the money", praising it for "tapp[ing] into Glee fever" and "pick[ing] up on a particular moment in culture with its all-singing, all-dancing groups.". Andrea Mullaney of The Scotsman deemed the series: "a predictable mash-up of the talented and deluded on their own 'journeys' being patronised and sniggered at by a judges who seem like they've just been introduced to each other 30 seconds before filming began.".

Australian adaptation
The Ten Network in Australia had announced that it would produce its own adaptation of the Don't Stop Believing as part of its line-up for 2011. However, the network disclosed in November 2010 that it had halted all production on the series indefinitely, saying only that it "may return at a later date.".

References

External links
.

2010 British television series debuts
2010 British television series endings
Channel 5 (British TV channel) reality television shows
English-language television shows
British music television shows
British reality television series
Singing talent shows